Alt-Berlin ("Old Berlin"), also spelled Altberlin, is a neighborhood (Stadtviertel), situated in the Berliner locality (Ortsteil) of Mitte, part of the homonymous borough. In the 13th century it was the sister town of the old Cölln, located on the northern Spree Island in the Margraviate of Brandenburg. It counts in its territory the zone of Nikolaiviertel.

History

First mentioned in 1244, 7 years after Cölln, it represents the original core of the modern Berlin. The first stone fortification was built, to defend both cities, in 1250 and in 1251 it gained city rights. In 1280 Berlin, gained the right to mint currency. In that period it appeared on a coat of arms for the first time, close to the symbol of the imperial eagle, two stylized bears, antecedents of the bear currently serving as the symbol of the city. On 20 March 1307 the town was united with Cölln (maintaining its name, Berlin) forming a trading union on political and security matters, and participated in the Hanseatic League.

Geography
Alt-Berlin, crossed at its southern borders by the river Spree, is located in the middle of the city. Its northern borders are represented, except for the square area of Alexanderplatz, by the Stadtbahn railway line between the station of Jannowitzbrücke and a rail bridge after Hackescher Markt station.

Photogallery

References

External links

Zones of Berlin
History of Berlin
Mitte